Myriam Bella is a French actress.

Filmography

Film 
 2007 : Comme les autres
 2010: The Return of the Son
 2011: Twiggy
 2015 : D'une pierre, deux coups

References

External links 
 

21st-century French actresses

Living people

Year of birth missing (living people)